"Blowing Kisses in the Wind" is the third single from Paula Abdul's album, Spellbound. The music video featured Abdul dancing on a theater stage, ballet-style. Like her other videos, it got strong play on MTV. The song was written by Peter Lord. Back up vocals were provided by Sweet Pea Atkinson.

The song was another popular hit for Abdul, peaking at number six on the Billboard Hot 100 and seven in Canada.

Background
The song is a ballad in the same vein as the album's lead single "Rush Rush" and lyrically discusses unrequited love. Originally, Virgin Records had intended to release "Vibeology" as the third single from Spellbound following Abdul's performance of the song at the 1991 MTV Video Music Awards; however, it was cancelled in favor of "Blowing Kisses in the Wind" which was receiving airplay at the time, creating demand for the song.

Chart performance 
"Blowing Kisses in the Wind" debuted at number 47 on the US Billboard Hot 100 chart, earning the Hot Shot Debut title for the week ending October 19, 1991. The following week, the song climbed to number 33, with that week gaining the title of Greatest Airplay Gainer. The single eventually peaked at number six, remaining at that spot for three consecutive weeks, before falling down the chart. Overall, "Blowing Kisses in the Wind" spent seven weeks in the Billboard Hot 100 Top 10. This was longer than her previous single "The Promise of a New Day" which peaked at number one. It was ranked at number 73 for the 1992 Year-end chart. 
The song is one of two top ten hits from Abdul not to top the chart as well as her last top ten hit to date.

Track listings and formats

US CD Promo 
 Blowing Kisses In the Wind - Edit (Peter Lord)
 Blowing Kisses In the Wind - LP (Peter Lord)

US Cassette
 Blowing Kisses In the Wind - LP (Peter Lord)
 Spellbound - LP  (Paula Abdul; Peter Lord; Sandra St. Victor; V. Jeffrey Smith)

Charts

Weekly charts

Year-end charts

References

1990s ballads
1991 songs
1991 singles
Music videos directed by Big T.V.
Paula Abdul songs
Pop ballads
Virgin Records singles